List of hospitals in Kyrgyzstan shows the hospitals (Russian: больница; pronunciation: Bol'nitsa), their locations and links to articles on notable hospitals.

Most of the hospitals are located in the city of Biskek.  The regions, and independent cities, are as follows:
 City of Bişkek
 Batken Region
 Chuy Region
 Jalal-Abad Region
 Naryn Region
 Osh Region
 Talas
 Issyk Kul Region
 City of Osh

Hospitals
Below are the known hospitals in Kyrgyzstan.  There are also two psychiatric hospitals not listed.

References 

Kyrgyzstan
 List of hospitals in Kyrgyzstan
Kyrgyzstan
Kyrgyzstan